William Anderson (1762December 16, 1829) was an American politician who served as a Democratic-Republican member of the U.S. House of Representatives for Pennsylvania's 1st congressional district from 1809 to 1815 and from 1817 to 1819.

Early life and military service
William Anderson was born in Accomack County in the Colony of Virginia in 1762.  During the Revolutionary War, he joined the Continental Army at the age of fifteen and served until the end of the war.  He was a major on the staff of General Lafayette and distinguished himself at Germantown and Yorktown.

He was married to Elizabeth Dixon.  In 1796, Anderson became engaged in the hotel business through the purchase of the Columbia House in Chester, Pennsylvania.

Political career
He served as Delaware County auditor in 1804 and county director of the poor in 1805.  He was a Jeffersonian democrat and held many public offices.

Anderson was elected as a Democratic-Republican to the Eleventh, Twelfth, and Thirteenth Congresses.  He was elected to the Fifteenth Congress.  He was appointed an associate judge of the county court on January 5, 1826, and resigned in 1828 to become an inspector of customs in Philadelphia.  He served until his death in Chester, Pennsylvania in 1829 and was interred in Old St. Paul's Church Cemetery.

Slaveholding 
Under Pennsylvania gradual abolition law, enslavers had six months to register the children of women they held in bondage. On July 2, 1806, Anderson registered a nineteen-week-old "male mulatto bastard child" named Francis as his property for twenty-eight years with the Delaware County clerk of courts. This registration reveals that Anderson owned Francis' mother, whom he held in either lifetime or term slavery.

References

Sources

The Political Graveyard

1762 births
1829 deaths
People from Accomack County, Virginia
Virginia colonial people
American people of Dutch descent
Democratic-Republican Party members of the United States House of Representatives from Pennsylvania
Pennsylvania state court judges
American slave owners
People from Chester, Pennsylvania
19th-century American politicians
Continental Army officers from Pennsylvania
Burials in Pennsylvania